Matti Suur-Hamari (born 31 May 1986) is a para-snowboarder. He is a three-time medalist, including two gold medals, at the Winter Paralympics.

He represented Finland at the 2014 Winter Paralympics and again at the 2018 Winter Paralympics where he served as flag-bearer in the 2018 Winter Paralympics Parade of Nations. He also competed at the 2022 Winter Paralympics.

Career
He claimed his first Paralympic medal during the 2018 Winter Paralympics in Snowboarding by claiming a gold medal in the men's snowboard cross event.

He won the gold medal in the men's snowboard cross SB-LL2 event at the 2021 World Para Snow Sports Championships held in Lillehammer, Norway.

He won the gold medal in the men's snowboard cross SB-LL2 event at the 2022 Winter Paralympics held in Beijing, China. He also won the silver medal in the men's banked slalom SB-LL2 event.

References

External links 
 Matti Suur-Hamari at World Para Snowboard
 
 

1986 births
Living people
Finnish male snowboarders
Paralympic snowboarders of Finland
Paralympic medalists in snowboarding
Paralympic gold medalists for Finland
Paralympic silver medalists for Finland
Paralympic bronze medalists for Finland
Snowboarders at the 2014 Winter Paralympics
Snowboarders at the 2018 Winter Paralympics
Snowboarders at the 2022 Winter Paralympics
Medalists at the 2018 Winter Paralympics
Medalists at the 2022 Winter Paralympics
People from Rovaniemi
Sportspeople from Lapland (Finland)
20th-century Finnish people
21st-century Finnish people